Peasants' Day is a public holiday in Myanmar, marking the 1962 Burmese coup d'état. In 1965, the Union Revolutionary Council designated the day as a gazetted holiday, and commemorates the contributions of farmers. Before the change, Peasants' Day was observed on 1 January.

See also 
Public holidays in Myanmar

References 

Burmese culture
Lists of events in Myanmar
Public holidays in Myanmar
Agriculture in Myanmar